Mordellistena variegata, the tumbling flower beetle, is a species of beetle in the genus Mordellistena in the family Mordellidae. It was described by Johan Christian Fabricius in 1798.

Distribution
The species can be found in the following European territories: Austria, Great Britain including the Isle of Man, Bulgaria, Czech Republic, Germany, Hungary, Italy, Poland, Slovakia, Slovenia, Spain, Switzerland, the Netherlands, Ukraine, and southern part of Russia.

References

External links

Beetles described in 1798
variegata